McLaughlin may refer to:

 McLaughlin (surname), an Irish and Scottish surname

Places

Canada
 Adelaide McLaughlin Public School, an elementary school in Oshawa, Ontario, Canada
 McLaughlin Planetarium, a former working planetarium immediately to the south of the Royal Ontario Museum in Toronto
 R S McLaughlin Collegiate and Vocational Institute, in Oshawa, Ontario, Canada

Outer space
 McLaughlin (lunar crater), located just behind the northwestern rim on the far side of the Moon
 McLaughlin (Martian crater)
 2024 McLaughlin, an asteroid discovered at Goethe Link Observatory by the Indiana Asteroid Program
 4838 Billmclaughlin minor planet discovered at Palomar

United States
 McLaughlin, South Dakota, a city in Corson County, South Dakota
 Bishop McLaughlin Catholic High School, a private, Roman Catholic high school in Hudson, Florida
 Charles D. McLaughlin House, located at 507 South 38th Street in the Gold Coast Historic District of Midtown Omaha, Nebraska

Other uses
 McLaughlin Motor Car Company, a Canadian car manufacturer later acquired by General Motors
 McLaughlin Award, an award given to the nation's most outstanding NCAA lacrosse midfielder since 1973
 McLaughlin v. Florida, a United States Supreme Court case
 McLaughlin v. Panetta, a United States lawsuit
 Rossiter–McLaughlin effect, a spectroscopic phenomenon
 The Able McLaughlins, a 1923 novel by Margaret Wilson
 The Law and the McLaughlins, a 1936 novel by Margaret Wilson
 The McLaughlin Group, a syndicated half-hour weekly public affairs television program in the United States

See also